The A1 highway is a highway in Nigeria. It connects Lagos in the south to the border with the Republic of Niger in the north of the country, connecting with the N1 highway of Niger at Birnin Konni.

The A1 constitutes the Nigerian section of the Trans-Sahara Highway from Algiers, and is the westernmost of the four main south-north highways of the country (named A1 to A4).

References 

Highways in Nigeria
Niger–Nigeria border crossings